Mihir is a given name. Notable people with the given name include:

Mihir Bose, British Indian journalist and author
Mihir Das, Indian actor
Mihir Desai, Indian human rights lawyer
Mihir A. Desai, American economist
Mihir Diwakar (born 1982), Indian cricketer
Mihir Goswami, Indian politician
Mihir Hirwani (born 1994), Indian cricketer
Mihir Joshi (born 1981), Indian singer and television anchor 
Mihir Kanti Shome, Indian politician
Mihir Mishra, Indian television actor
Mihir Rakshit (born 1936), Indian economist
Mihir Sen (1930–1997), Indian long distance swimmer
Mihir Sengupta, Indian writer
Mihir Shah, Indian economist
Mihir Sharma, Indian economist
 Mihir Bafna, Indian